The White Bus is a 1967 British short drama film directed by Lindsay Anderson. The screenplay was jointly adapted with Shelagh Delaney from a short story in her collection Sweetly Sings the Donkey (1963). The White Bus was also the film debut of Anthony Hopkins.

Plot
The main character, only referred to as 'the girl' (Patricia Healey) leaves London, goes north on a train full of football fans and takes a trip in a white double-decker bus around an unnamed city she is visiting, although it is clearly based on Manchester; Delaney was born and grew up in nearby Salford. The Mayor (Arthur Lowe), a local businessman, and the council's ceremonial macebearer (John Sharp) happen also to be taking the trip while they show the city to visiting foreigners.

Cast
Patricia Healey as The Girl
Arthur Lowe as The Mayor
John Sharp as The Macebearer
Julie Perry as Conductress
Stephen Moore as Young Man
Victor Henry as Transistorite
John Savident, Fanny Carby, Malcolm Taylor, Alan O'Keeffe as Supporters
Anthony Hopkins as Brechtian
Jeanne Watts, Eddie King as Fish Shop Couple
Barry Evans as Boy
Penny Ryder as Girl
Dennis Alaba Peters as Mr Wombe

History and production
The film was originally commissioned by producer Oscar Lewenstein, then a director of Woodfall, as one third of a 'portmanteau' feature entitled Red, White and Zero, with the other sections supplied by Anderson's Free Cinema collaborators Tony Richardson and Karel Reisz from the other short stories by Shelagh Delaney.

The "first real day's shooting" was on 19 October 1965, and took about a month to complete.

The two other planned sections of the film developed into what became Richardson's Red and Blue and Peter Brook's Ride of the Valkyrie (1967), Reisz having dropped out, both of which are unrelated to Delaney's work. Of these, only The White Bus received a theatrical release in the UK.

Notes

External links

1967 films
1967 drama films
British drama short films
Films directed by Lindsay Anderson
Films set in Manchester
Films shot in Greater Manchester
1960s English-language films
1960s British films